Wesley Grapp served as head of the Los Angeles Federal Bureau of Investigation (FBI) office. He was the agent who carried out Hoover's orders to give FBI information to University of California senior regent Edwin W. Pauley. Pauley allegedly had a history of political connections with the Office of Strategic Services (OSS), forerunner of today's CIA, as well as a close association with Allen Dulles, OSS, later to serve as director of the Central Intelligence Agency, (1953–1961).

Grapp left the FBI in 1972 and headed security for Flying Tigers Airlines. He is retired.

Sources
 Where are they now? / Other key players

Living people
Federal Bureau of Investigation agents
University of California regents
Year of birth missing (living people)